Jon C. Thomas (January 22, 1939 – June 12, 2013) was an American politician. He served as a member for the 86th district of the Florida House of Representatives. He also served as a member for the 30th district of the Florida Senate.

Life and career 
Thomas was born in Uniontown, Pennsylvania. He served in the United States Army.

In 1970, Thomas was elected to represent the 86th district of the Florida House of Representatives, succeeding Henry J. Prominski. He served until 1974, when he was succeeded by Karen B. Coolman. In the same year, he was elected to represent the 30th district of the Florida Senate, serving until 1978.

Thomas died in June 2013, at the age of 74.

References 

1939 births
2013 deaths
People from Uniontown, Pennsylvania
Members of the Florida House of Representatives
Florida state senators
Florida Democrats
Florida Republicans
20th-century American politicians